Paradiclybothrium is a genus of monogeneans in the family Diclybothriidae. It consists of one species, Paradiclybothrium pacificum Bychowski & Gusev, 1950.

References

Polyopisthocotylea
Monogenea genera
Monotypic protostome genera